Gangster! is a role-playing game published by Fantasy Games Unlimited in 1979.

Gameplay
Gangster! is a cops-and-mobsters role-playing game system set in the period 1900 to the present. Players can choose to be on the side of the law as police (city or federal), or they can roleplay a criminal, either as loner or as part of a syndicate. The combat covers many sorts of firearms. The game rules include sections on crimes and corruption, gang wars, police methods, forensic medicine, FBI labs, and SWAT teams, with guidelines on the laws of the land, criminal law, conviction, and penalties. 

As with most role-playing games, one player is the game master, while the other players roleplay characters that can either be lawmakers or lawbreakers. To start a game, the players roll up their character's abilities using three six-sided dice. They also use the dice to determine the number of crime-busting or criminal skills the character has. Low dice rolls may leave a character with no skills.  Once the players have decided on their characters' roles, the game master runs the game in much the same way as other role-playing games.

The combat system in Gangster is unusually lethal compared to other roleplaying systems. Reviewer Kenneth Burke noted that a knife wound that have almost no effect on a character in Gamma World could be lethal in Gangster.

Publication history
Gangster! was designed by Nick Marinacci and Pete Petrone. A former New York police officer was consulted about the design. It was published by Fantasy Games Unlimited in 1979 as a boxed set with a 56-page rulebook, a "patrol guide" booklet describing the numerous laws that the characters must uphold (or break), a character record sheet, and combat tables.

Robert N. Charrette created 25 mm miniatures to accompany Gangster!

Reception
Leonard H. Kanterman, M.D. reviewed Gangster! for Different Worlds magazine and stated that "should a Gamemaster find that his group has fallen into a rut, and castle walls and twisting caverns have become so familiar a setting that there is boring repetition rather than fresh adventure, he would be well-advised to 'check it out' with Gangster."

In the March 1980 edition of Dragon, Kenneth Burke generally admired Gangster, although he was disappointed that the game did not supply the three six-sided dice and the twenty-sided die required for play. Burke did not like the character generation system, which, he said, is "one of the few flaws of Gangster — characters without unusually high ability levels [are] unable to qualify for any skills, the criminals in particular." However, he admired the combat system for its realistic lethality. "This attitude towards melee I find refreshing; role-playing games too often have rules that reduce the true effect of weapon hits, making combat the 'easy way out.' Gangster puts an end to this nonsense with one of the most realistic melee systems in existence." Burke highly recommended it, saying, "Of all the role-playing games in existence, Gangster is undoubtedly the most original. On a scale of one to ten, I rate Gangster a ten, and advise all to buy it.

Reviews
Fantastic Science Fiction v27 n10

References

Fantasy Games Unlimited games
Historical role-playing games
Role-playing games introduced in 1979